Vladimir Drobnjak (born 5 March 1956) is a Croatian diplomat who is the current Permanent Representative of Croatia to the United Nations, since 2013.

Biography
Born in Zagreb in the Socialist Federal Republic of Yugoslavia, Drobnjak graduated from the University of Zagreb Law School. He worked as a radio and newspaper correspondent from 1986 until 1992, at which point he joined the foreign service. His first position was Deputy Permanent Representative to the UN in New York City, and since then Drobnjak held various posts regarding Croatia's relations with the European Union. From 2012 until 2013 he was the head of the Croatian mission to the EU and then the permanent representative of Croatia to the EU after it joined. In August 2013, he was appointed the Permanent Representative of Croatia to the UN. In January 2014 Drobnjak became the Vice President of the UN Economic and Social Council.

References

1956 births
Living people
Croatian diplomats
Journalists from Zagreb
Permanent Representatives of Croatia to the United Nations